"Remember the Name" is a song by English singer-songwriter Ed Sheeran featuring American rappers Eminem and 50 Cent from the former's compilation album, No.6 Collaborations Project (2019). It was released as a promotional single through Asylum and Atlantic Records. The song was produced by Sheeran, alongside Max Martin, Shellback, and Fred. They also served as songwriters alongside the rappers and Patrick Brown, Raymon Murra, Rico Wade, André Benjamin and Antwan Patton, with the latter five receiving credit due to the usage of words and music from Outkast's single "So Fresh, So Clean" (2001).

"Remember the Name" received generally mixed to negative reviews from music critics, who often highlighted the "Dr. Dre-inspired production", with numerous reviewers criticising Eminem and 50 Cent's verses. In 2019, Spin listed the song as being among the worst of the year. It charted in various countries, including in the top ten of New Zealand and Slovakia, and peaked at number three on the UK R&B chart. It was also certified gold by the British Phonographic Industry and gold by Music Canada.

Background

In March 2016, Paul Rosenberg, Eminem's manager, asked Ed Sheeran to send song ideas for inclusion on Eminem's ninth studio album Revival (2017). Sheeran recorded a demo of the chorus of "River", with drums, guitar and piano, at Russell Crowe's studio and sent it to Rosenberg, not hearing back until May 2017. "River" was released as the second single from the album, featuring Sheeran's vocals. He told BBC News he wished to collaborate with the rapper on two tracks, an "introspective, storytelling" one and another "a nod towards the cheekier songs" on earlier Eminem albums.

According to him, "River" accomplished the former goal, so he sought the involvement of American rapper 50 Cent to create the second track. Sheeran encountered 50 Cent during a visit to Eminem's dressing room: "I walked into Eminem's dressing room and 50 Cent was in there, and I was like: this has to be meant to be". Sheeran thought that being allowed on a track with the two rappers proved that his detractors' claims that he cannot rap did not matter. "Remember the Name" was recorded in December 2018; 50 Cent recalled the following day, "I recorded a song last night with Eminem & Ed Sheeran, ".

Production
"Remember the Name" was produced by Max Martin, Shellback, FRED and Sheeran himself. It was co-written by the latter four along with Eminem, 50 Cent and Patrick Brown, Raymon Murra, Rico Wade, André Benjamin and Antwan Patton, the latter five received credit due to the usage of words and music from Outkast's single "So Fresh, So Clean" (2001). Martin and Shellback were in charge of programming and keyboards, while Sheeran played the guitars. FRED played drums, keyboards, guitar, bass, and was also responsible for programming the track. The song was engineered by Ky Miller and Michael Ilbert. Eminem's vocals were recorded by Mike Strange, Tony Campana and Joe Strange. "Remember the Name" was recorded at MXM Studios in Stockholm, Promised Land Music Studios in London, and Effigy Studios in Detroit. The track was mixed by Mike Strange at Effigy Studios.

Composition and lyrical interpretation
"Remember the Name" is a hip hop song composed in the key of E minor with a tempo of 91 beats per minute. Sheeran "does some light rapping" on the song, while the two rappers deliver lyrics about their rise to stardom. The former raps a reference to the English town of Ipswich, by saying, "I was born a misfit / Grew up 10 miles from the town of Ipswich". He described the lyric as a "personal highlight", noting it was "funny [as] Eminem would never ever know where Ipswich is". Sheeran begins it by sing-speaking about how he was repeatedly doubted during the beginning of his career, and discouraged from rapping, "Stick to singing, stop rappin' like it's Christmas". He also talks about "drugs, fame and stature", and how he idolizes Eminem and 50 Cent. The song's instrumentation makes use of staccato guitars, pounded pianos, plucked strings and piercing synths, played over a 2001-inspired stomp-clap beat. From the hook up to the chorus, Sheeran channels the delivery and vocal stylings of American singer Nate Dogg. Eminem sings about his dislike of skinny jeans over intricate rhyme schemes and drops "finger-on-the-pulse references to his breakout single from 1999, 'My Name Is'". 50 Cent chants about his designer clothes, luxurious lifestyle and stature in the rap industry. Sheeran and 50 Cent "insist that 'it's 'bout time you remember the name.'"

Release and reception
"Remember the Name" was released as the eighth track on Sheeran's fourth studio album, No.6 Collaborations Project, on 12 July 2019. The song was met with generally mixed to negative reviews from music critics. HipHop-N-Mores Navjosh called it "catchy" and likened the instrumentals to the work of Dr. Dre, noting that unlike other superstar collaborations, it did not disappoint. Mitch Findlay of HotNewHipHop noted its "vintage-sounding instrumental[s]" and "nostalgic arrangement", adding that Eminem held back during his verse but had a sharp flow, and that 50 Cent showcased his charisma. Elite Dailys Jamie Leelo praised the song's lyrics and said they "might also withstand the test of time".

In a mixed review, Andrew Unterberger of Billboard thought 50 Cent's verse sounds "a little phoned-in" and Eminem's verse opts for an unnecessary amount of puns, although he praised the Dr. Dre-inspired production and Sheeran's delivery during the hook. He commended Sheeran for making his dream of collaborating with the two rappers come true, saying "It's a situation of such unreal wish-fulfilment you'd probably never even think to fantasize about it in the first place, and you can't help but smile a little bit for Sheeran that he gets to live it out". Writing for Uproxx, Aaron Williams described "Remember the Name" as "an odd patchwork of styles and concepts" and did not foresee lasting success for it despite finding it "kind of cool" in the context of the album. Bernadette Giacomazzo writing for HipHopDX felt that due to Eminem's and 50 Cent's verses, "Sheeran's presence is superfluous".

Writing for NME, Nick Levine said "Sheeran and Eminem collaborated effectively enough on 'River' (2017), but this cheesy throwback jam (which features 50 Cent for added retro vibes) almost feels like a parody". He opined that the Ipswich reference "sound[s] as though he's recruited David Brent to ghost-write his rhymes". Seth Wilson from Slant compared "Eminem's guest verse" to someone "doing a pretty good Eminem impression at a karaoke bar". He concluded, "the song is basically one big strawman boast track". Variety Chris Willman and Clash Malvika Padin shared a similar opinion, as they both did not enjoy the song despite the artists involved in it.

Alexis Petridis from The Guardian claimed the song did not work and that "there's something jarring about Eminem rapping about sticking nails in his eyeballs next to Sheeran repping Ipswich." The Observer Michael Graff dubbed the track "woeful". Rawiya Kameir of Pitchfork affirmed that Sheeran was unable to rap, also claiming that both Eminem and 50 Cent were "way past their prime as rappers". Kameir concluded, "Sheeran is better off sticking within his skillset." The song was listed as one of the year's worst by Spin, and the staff said that it "it offers an unusually unfettered look at the piles of generically trendy leftovers that a pop singer can compile between album cycles with an unchecked budget and incoherent vision".

Chart performance
"Remember the Name" charted in various countries, including the United Kingdom, where it debuted at number one on the Official Trending Chart. The song reached number three on the UK R&B Singles chart, and was certified gold by the British Phonographic Industry. It peaked at number 57 on the US Billboard Hot 100 and reached number 22 on the Billboard Hot R&B/Hip-Hop Songs chart. In Canada, "Remember the Name" charted at number 20 and earned a gold certification given by Music Canada. The song reached number 15 in Australia and number 10 in New Zealand. It also peaked at number nine on Slovakia's Singles Digitál Top 100, number 11 on the same chart in the Czech Republic, and number 13 in Finland. "Remember the Name" debuted at number 20 in Sweden and number 22 in Denmark, spending three weeks on each country's chart. The song also peaked at number 24 in Norway and number 29 in Germany.

Personnel
Credits adapted from the liner notes of No.6 Collaborations Project.

Ed Sheeran – vocals, guitars, songwriter, producer
Marshall Mathers – additional vocals, songwriter
Curtis Jackson – additional vocals, songwriter
Karl Martin Sandberg – songwriter, programming, keyboards, producer
Karl Johan Schuster – songwriter, programming, keyboards, producer
FRED – drums, keyboards, guitar, bass, programming, producer
Patrick Brown – songwriter
Raymon Murray – songwriter

Rico Wade – songwriter
André Benjamin – songwriter
Antwan Patton – songwriter
Ky Miller – engineering
Michael Ilbert – engineering
Tony Campana – recording
Joe Strange – recording
Mike Strange – recording, mixing

Charts and certifications

Charts

Certifications

References

2019 songs
British hip hop songs
Ed Sheeran songs
50 Cent songs
Eminem songs
Song recordings produced by Ed Sheeran
Song recordings produced by Max Martin
Song recordings produced by Shellback (record producer)
Songs written by 50 Cent
Songs written by André 3000
Songs written by Big Boi
Songs written by Ed Sheeran
Songs written by Eminem
Songs written by Max Martin
Songs written by Shellback (record producer)
Songs written by Sleepy Brown